The Joseph Jacobberger Country House is a historic house in the Hillsdale district of Multnomah County, Oregon, United States, just outside the Portland municipal boundary. Leading Portland architect and civic activist Joseph Jacobberger (1869–1930) designed this Arts and Crafts style house for his family in 1916, and lived in it from 1917 until his death. He resided here through the height of his career, a period during which he designed over 250 commissions that shaped the face of Portland, including homes, schools, colleges, churches, a cathedral, commercial buildings, and others.

The house was listed on the National Register of Historic Places in 2011.

See also
Josef Jacobberger House
National Register of Historic Places listings in Multnomah County, Oregon

References

External links

Houses on the National Register of Historic Places in Portland, Oregon
National Register of Historic Places in Multnomah County, Oregon
Arts and Crafts architecture in Oregon
Houses completed in 1917
1917 establishments in Oregon
Joseph Jacobberger buildings